A Tom Collins is an alcoholic cocktail made with gin and other mixers.

Tom Collins may also refer to:
 Joseph Furphy (1843–1912), Australian author who mostly wrote under the pseudonym Tom Collins
 Tom Collins (athlete), Irish athlete who held the 5 mile world's record
 Tom Collins (Rent character), character in the rock musical Rent
 Tom Collins (rugby, born 1895) (1895–1957), rugby union and rugby league footballer of the 1920s for Wales (RU), Mountain Ash, and Hull (RL)
 Tom Francis Collins (1886–1907), convicted murderer
 Tom Collins (footballer) (1882–1929), Scottish international footballer who played for Heart of Midlothian, Bathgate, East Fife and Tottenham Hotspur
 Tom Collins (dual player) (?–2008), dual player from County Kerry, Ireland
 Tom Collins (boxer) (born 1955), British boxer
 Tom Collins (record producer) (born 1942), American country music producer of Ronnie Milsap, Barbara Mandrell, & others
 Tom Collins (rugby union, born 1994), English rugby union player
 Tom Collins, producer of the ice show Champions on Ice
 Tom Collins, bass player of the band Acroma

See also
 Thomas Collins (disambiguation)
 Tommy Collins (disambiguation)
 Collins (surname)

Collins, Tom